Mahmudiyeh may refer to:

Mahmudiyeh, Hamadan
Mahmudiyeh, Bardsir, Kerman Province
Mahmudiyeh, Rafsanjan, Kerman Province
Mahmudiyeh, Azadegan, Rafsanjan County, Kerman Province
Mahmudiyeh, Ferdows, Rafsanjan County, Kerman Province
Mahmudiyeh, Rigan, Kerman Province
Mahmudiyeh, Markazi

See also
Mahmoudiyah (disambiguation)